Xeropsamobeus asellus is a species of aphodiine dung beetle in the family Scarabaeidae. It is found in the United States and Mexico, although other sources consider it endemic to Texas.

References

Further reading

External links

 

Scarabaeidae
Beetles of North America
Beetles described in 1907